The '9600 port' (also named data-jack or data-port) is an industry-specific name given to a special connector on the back of amateur radio HF, VHF, and UHF transceivers. It is used for connecting a packet radio modem or any other type of data-modem which uses audio tones to convey data.

This port is capable of transmitting and receiving data at speeds of at least 9600 bits per second, but usually faster. This is achieved by bypassing the highpass, lowpass, preemphasis, and deemphasis filters normally contained in the microphone and speaker circuits of an FM transmitter and receiver.

Amateur radio data ports which are not "9600 capable" are typically limited to a max speed of 1200 to 3000 bits per second.

Commonly this 9600-capable data port uses a 6-pin mini-DIN connector (shown to the right).
This is the same physical connector-type as PS/2 port mice and keyboards.

Modem Manufacturers
There are a number of manufacturers making modems intended for this 9600 port / data port.
 Kantronics
 Tigertronics
 Argent Data
 Byonics
 Coastal ChipWorks 
 MFJ Enterprises
 Symek
 Timewave Technologies

Radio Manufacturers
There are a number of manufacturers making radios which include a 9600 capable data port as a feature:
 Alinco
 Icom Incorporated
 Yaesu
 Kenwood

Software Modems
The 9600 port can also be connected to computer's soundcard for use with a number of different software-based data modems:
 Direwolf
 MixW
 AGW Packet Engine
 Soundmodem
 UZ7HO Soundmodem

Digital Voice 
The 9600 port can be used to connect a digital voice adapter, or dongle, which allows analog amateur radios to transmit and receive ICOM's D-Star digital voice protocol (AMBE2020).
 Digital Voice Dongle
 Star*DV / Star*Board
 DVRPTR_V1 D-Star boards
 PAPA GMSK Boards
 DUTCH*Star

Users of this technology

This 9600 port is used to communicate with some amateur radio satellites using the packet radio

A 9600-baud capable amateur radio and modem are installed aboard the International Space Station as part of the ARISS project.

References

Amateur radio